Presidential elections were held in Guinea on 18 October 2020. Incumbent president Alpha Condé was running for a third term. He was challenged by former prime minister Cellou Dalein Diallo, as well as several other candidates.

Background

The Guinean constitution limits a president to two terms. However, changes in the new constitution passed in the controversial constitutional referendum earlier in the year included resetting the presidential terms allowing incumbent president Alpha Condé to run for a third term. Both the referendum and the legislative election being run alongside it was boycotted by most of the opposition, and was marred by protests. 

Former prime minister Cellou Dalein Diallo who ran against Condé and placed second in the previous two presidential elections ran again after first considering boycotting the vote, and was seen as the main challenger. Protests against the incumbent president have continued throughout the year. The protests have been harshly repressed by security forces claiming a number of civilian lives.

Electoral system
The elections were held using the two-round system, with a second round taking place between the top two finishers on 24 November 2020 if no candidate received more than 50% of the vote in the first round.

Results
Preliminary estimates were reported to indicate that Diallo was in the lead. On 19 October, Diallo declared himself the winner of the election despite the official results not being known yet, based on polling information gathered by his party. The incumbent president condemned this declaration as "irresponsible and dangerous." The electoral commission expected the official results to be released by the end of the week. With 96.14% of the results counted, the Independent National Electoral Commission declared incumbent president Alpha Condé the winner in the first round with 59.49% of the vote on 24 October.

Aftermath
Diallo called for mass demonstrations after Condé's victory was certified by the election commission. The post-election period saw national protests in which at least 12 people were killed by security forces, including two children in Conakry. 

Monitors from the African Union and ECOWAS said the election took place transparently and was conducted properly.

In September 2021, the military overthrew Condé in a coup d'état and detained him.

See also
2021 Guinean coup d'état
2020 Ivorian presidential election

References

Guinea
Presidential election
October 2020 events in Africa
Presidential elections in Guinea